AMC Machine is an automobile nameplate applied to two vehicles built by American Motors Corporation:

 The Machine - a high-performance muscle car based on the 1970 AMC Rebel 
 Matador Machine - an option package for the 1971 AMC Matador

References

The Machine